Afeez Oyetoro (born 20 August 1963) is a Nigerian comic actor, popularly known as "Saka".

Early life and education
Afeez Oyetoro was born on 20 August 1963, in  Iseyin Local Government Area of Oyo State southwestern Nigeria.
Afeez obtained a Bachelor's and Master's arts degree in Theatre art from Obafemi Awolowo University (OAU) and the University of Ibadan (UI) respectively. He is currently a  doctorate degree holder from the University of Ibadan, Ibadan. in Oyo State

Career
Afeez Oyetoro is known for his clown role in Nollywood movies and has featured in several Nigerian films.
He is currently a lecturer in the department of theatre art at Adeniran Ogunsanya College of Education, Lagos State, Nigeria.
He also featured as the main character in a 2013 MTN advert where he announced "I don port o." In 2016, Afeez Oyetoro happens to appear in a movie named The Wedding Party and in the comedy-crime/heist film Ojukokoro (Greed). He was elected as vice president in the  Golden Movie Ambassadors Association of Nigeria (TGMAAN).

Personal life
Afeez Oyetoro is Legally married to Olaide Oyetoro. They both bore three children, two sons; Abdullah Oyetoro and Munim Oyetoro, and a daughter Rodiat Oyetoro.

Filmography
Taxi Driver: Oko Ashewo (2015)
Ojukokoro (2016)
The Wedding Party (2016)
The Wedding Party 2 (2017)
The Call (2019 Nollywood film) 
Small Chops (2020)
Shadow Parties (2020)
The Miracle Centre (2020)

Television
Hustle (2016-2018)

See also
List of Yoruba people

References

Living people
1963 births
Nigerian male film actors
Male actors from Oyo State
Nigerian male comedians
Male actors in Yoruba cinema
Yoruba comedians
Obafemi Awolowo University alumni
University of Ibadan alumni
People from Oyo State
Academic staff of Adeniran Ogunsanya College of Education
Nigerian comedians
Actors from Oyo State
20th-century Nigerian actors